House Broken is a 1936 British comedy film directed by Michael Hankinson and starring Louis Borel, Jack Lambert and Mary Lawson. A wife tries to make her husband jealous by flirting with a Frenchman.

The film was made at Rock Studios, Elstree, as a quota quickie for release by Paramount Pictures.

Cast
 Louis Borel as Charles Delmont 
 Jack Lambert as Jock Macgregor 
 Mary Lawson as Angela Macgregor 
 Enid Stamp-Taylor as Peggy Allen

References

Bibliography
 Chibnall, Steve. Quota Quickies: The Birth of the British 'B' Film. British Film Institute, 2007.
 Low, Rachael. Filmmaking in 1930s Britain. George Allen & Unwin, 1985.
 Wood, Linda. British Films, 1927-1939. British Film Institute, 1986.

External links

1936 films
British comedy films
British black-and-white films
1936 comedy films
Films directed by Michael Hankinson
Films shot at Rock Studios
Films produced by Anthony Havelock-Allan
British and Dominions Studios films
Paramount Pictures films
Quota quickies
1930s English-language films
1930s British films